Obermann is a German surname. Notable people with the surname include:

Holger Obermann (1936–2021), German football player, football manager, journalist, television reporter
Jacob Obermann (1819–1887), American businessman, German immigrant
Josephine Obermann (born 1983), German curler
Karl Obermann (1905–1987), German historian
René Obermann (born 1963), German manager

German-language surnames